Snake River is a waterway on the Seward Peninsula in the U.S. state of Alaska. Flowing southerly, it discharges into Norton Sound, Bering Sea, at Nome, with its mouth lying between the city's downtown area and its main airport.

Gallery

See also
 List of rivers of Alaska

References

External links

 Alaska Fishing and Hunting Guides Directory
 Inactive Snake Hydrological Station
 Photos

Rivers of Nome Census Area, Alaska
Rivers of the Seward Peninsula
Rivers of Alaska
Rivers of Unorganized Borough, Alaska